is a Japanese anthology manga series written by Nanki Satō and illustrated by Akira Kiduki. It was serialized in Shogakukan's seinen manga magazine Monthly Ikki from March 2009 to April 2012, with its chapters collected in four tankōbon volumes.

Publication
Shogakukan collected its chapters in four tankōbon volumes, released from December 26, 2009, to June 29, 2012.

Volume list

See also
Usotsuki Paradox, another manga series by the same authors
Boku wa Ikemen, another manga series by the same authors

References

Further reading

External links
 

Manga anthologies
Seinen manga
Sexuality in anime and manga
Shogakukan manga